Nomuraea is a genus of fungi in the family Clavicipitaceae.

The genus name of Nomuraea is in honour of H. Nomura (b.1897), who was a Japanese scientist. 

The genus was circumscribed by André Maublanc in Bull. Soc. Mycol. France vol.19 on page 295 in 1903.

Species
Species fungorum lists:
 Nomuraea anemonoides A.D. Hocking (1977)
 Nomuraea owariensis Uchiy. & Udagawa (2002)

Reclassified Species Names
Five species have been reassigned to other genera, including the entomopathogenic fungus species "Nomuraea rilei" (now in Metarhizium) which shows potential for control of insect pests in the Noctuidae.
 N. atypicola (Yasuda) Samson (1974) is a synonym of Purpureocillium atypicola (Ophiocordycipitaceae)
 N. cylindrosporae (Q.T. Chen & H.L. Guo) Tzean, L.S. Hsieh, J.L. Chen & W.J. Wu (1993) is a synonym of Metarhizium cylindrosporum (Clavicipitaceae)
 N. rileyi (Farl.) Samson (1974) and N. prasina Maubl. (1903) are synonyms of Metarhizium rileyi
 N. viridula Tzean, L.S. Hsieh, J.L. Chen & W.J. Wu (1992) is a synonym of Metarhizium viridulum

References

External links
 
 

Clavicipitaceae
Hypocreales genera